The 76th parallel north is a circle of latitude that is 76 degrees north of the Earth's equatorial plane, in the Arctic. It crosses the Atlantic Ocean, Europe, Asia, the Arctic Ocean and North America.

At this latitude the sun is visible for 24 hours, 0 minutes during the summer solstice and nautical twilight during the winter solstice.

Around the world
Starting at the Prime Meridian and heading eastwards, the parallel 76° north passes through:

{| class="wikitable plainrowheaders"
! scope="col" width="125" | Co-ordinates
! scope="col" | Country, territory or sea
! scope="col" | Notes
|-valign="top"
| style="background:#b0e0e6;" | 
! scope="row" style="background:#b0e0e6;" | Atlantic Ocean
| style="background:#b0e0e6;" | Greenland Sea Norwegian Sea
|-
| style="background:#b0e0e6;" | 
! scope="row" style="background:#b0e0e6;" | Barents Sea
| style="background:#b0e0e6;" |
|-
| 
! scope="row" | 
| Novaya Zemlya - Severny Island
|-
| style="background:#b0e0e6;" | 
! scope="row" style="background:#b0e0e6;" | Kara Sea
| style="background:#b0e0e6;" | Passing just north of the Izvestiy TSIK Islands, 
|-
| 
! scope="row" | 
| Taymyr Peninsula 
|-
| style="background:#b0e0e6;" | 
! scope="row" style="background:#b0e0e6;" | Laptev Sea
| style="background:#b0e0e6;" |
|-
| 
! scope="row" | 
| New Siberian Islands - Kotelny Island
|-
| style="background:#b0e0e6;" | 
! scope="row" style="background:#b0e0e6;" | East Siberian Sea
| style="background:#b0e0e6;" |
|-
| 
! scope="row" | 
| New Siberian Islands - Bunge Land and Faddeyevsky Island
|-
| style="background:#b0e0e6;" | 
! scope="row" style="background:#b0e0e6;" | East Siberian Sea
| style="background:#b0e0e6;" | Passing just south of Zhokhov Island, 
|-
| style="background:#b0e0e6;" | 
! scope="row" style="background:#b0e0e6;" | Arctic Ocean
| style="background:#b0e0e6;" |
|-
| 
! scope="row" | 
| Northwest Territories - Prince Patrick Island
|-
| style="background:#b0e0e6;" | 
! scope="row" style="background:#b0e0e6;" | Crozier Channel
| style="background:#b0e0e6;" |
|-
| 
! scope="row" | 
| Northwest Territories - Eglinton Island
|-
| style="background:#b0e0e6;" | 
! scope="row" style="background:#b0e0e6;" | Kellett Strait
| style="background:#b0e0e6;" |
|-
| 
! scope="row" | 
| Northwest Territories - Melville Island
|-
| style="background:#b0e0e6;" | 
! scope="row" style="background:#b0e0e6;" | Hecla and Griper Bay
| style="background:#b0e0e6;" |
|-
| 
! scope="row" | 
| Nunavut - Melville Island
|-
| style="background:#b0e0e6;" | 
! scope="row" style="background:#b0e0e6;" | Weatherall Bay
| style="background:#b0e0e6;" |
|-
| 
! scope="row" | 
| Nunavut - Melville Island 
|-
| style="background:#b0e0e6;" | 
! scope="row" style="background:#b0e0e6;" | Byam Martin Channel
| style="background:#b0e0e6;" |
|-
| 
! scope="row" | 
| Nunavut - Massey Island
|-
| style="background:#b0e0e6;" | 
! scope="row" style="background:#b0e0e6;" | Erskine Inlet
| style="background:#b0e0e6;" | Passing just north of Alexander Island, Nunavut, 
|-
| 
! scope="row" | 
| Nunavut - Bathurst Island, passing through the May Inlet
|-valign="top"
| style="background:#b0e0e6;" | 
! scope="row" style="background:#b0e0e6;" | Queens Channel
| style="background:#b0e0e6;" | Passing just north of Baring Island, Nunavut,  Passing just south of Dundas Island and Margaret Island, Nunavut, 
|-
| style="background:#b0e0e6;" | 
! scope="row" style="background:#b0e0e6;" | Wellington Channel
| style="background:#b0e0e6;" | Passing just north of Baillie-Hamilton Island, Nunavut, 
|-
| 
! scope="row" | 
| Nunavut - Devon Island
|-
| style="background:#b0e0e6;" | 
! scope="row" style="background:#b0e0e6;" | Jones Sound
| style="background:#b0e0e6;" |
|-
| 
! scope="row" | 
| Nunavut - Coburg Island
|-
| style="background:#b0e0e6;" | 
! scope="row" style="background:#b0e0e6;" | Baffin Bay
| style="background:#b0e0e6;" |
|-
| 
! scope="row" | 
| Crimson Cliffs near Cape York
|-
| style="background:#b0e0e6;" | 
! scope="row" style="background:#b0e0e6;" | Melville Bay
| style="background:#b0e0e6;" |
|-
| 
! scope="row" | 
|King Oscar Glacier
|-
| style="background:#b0e0e6;" | 
! scope="row" style="background:#b0e0e6;" | Dove Bay
| style="background:#b0e0e6;" |
|-
| 
! scope="row" | 
| Store Koldewey Island
|-
| style="background:#b0e0e6;" | 
! scope="row" style="background:#b0e0e6;" | Atlantic Ocean
| style="background:#b0e0e6;" | Greenland Sea
|-
|}

See also
75th parallel north
77th parallel north

n76
Geography of the Arctic